John Dalgleish (10 July 1940 – 27 June 2014) was an  Australian rules footballer who played with North Melbourne in the Victorian Football League (VFL).

Notes

External links 

1940 births
2014 deaths
Australian rules footballers from Victoria (Australia)
North Melbourne Football Club players
Shepparton Football Club players